Pishkuh Rural District may refer to:
 Pishkuh Rural District (South Khorasan Province)
 Pishkuh Rural District (Taft County), Yazd province

See also
Pishkuh-e Mugui Rural District, in Isfahan Province
Pishkuh-e Zalaqi Rural District, in Lorestan Province